The Bruges Matins (Dutch: Brugse Metten, French: Matines Brugeoises) is a yearly friendly tournament organised by the Belgian football club Club Brugge KV.

The name of the tournament refers to the nocturnal massacre in Bruges in 1302, which is called the Bruges Matins. The tournament was first organised in 1976 as a four-team competition. However, since 1991, with the exception of 1992, it was reduced to just a one-match tournament between Club Brugge and another team. Normally, teams from abroad are invited, but sometimes other Belgian teams take part. On two occasions, a national team was present, namely Senegal in 1985 and Morocco in 1987. In case Club Brugge play in the Belgian Super Cup, the match won't be organised that season.

The winner of the tournament wins a trophy called Goedendag, which is an alternative name of the medieval club-like weapon more commonly known under the name Morning star. As a result, the tournament is sometimes also called "The Goedendag Trophy".

Finals
Note: In case of a draw, penalties usually decided the winner. However, both in 1991 and 2014 the game ended in a draw and no winner was declared.

References

External links
Trofee De Goedendag, at RSSSF

Club Brugge KV
Belgian football friendly trophies
1976 establishments in Belgium
Recurring sporting events established in 1976